The Edmonton Eskimos were a baseball team that played in the class-D Western Canada League from 1909 until the league's demise in 1914 (when they were known as the Esquimos), and later in a revival of the league between 1919 and 1921.   They were known as the Gray Birds in 1912 and 1913.  They joined the Western International League for one season in 1922.    They were also members of the Western International League in 1953-54.

Home Field

 Diamond Park 1909-1914, 1919-1921, 1922
 Renfrew Park 1953-1954

Defunct minor league baseball teams
Esk
Defunct baseball teams in Canada